Pavakkulam South Bank - Track 07 Grama Niladhari Division is a Grama Niladhari Division of the Vavuniya South Divisional Secretariat  of Vavuniya District  of Northern Province, Sri Lanka .  It has Grama Niladhari Division Code C209D.

Pavakkulam South Bank - Track 07 is a surrounded by the Awaranthulawa, Unit 2 Pavatkulam, Periya Ulukkulama, Acres 20 - 40 - 60, Acres 400, Unit 9 & 10 Pavatkulam, Kangankulam, Kanthasamy Nagar and Poomaduwa  Grama Niladhari Divisions.

Demographics

Ethnicity 

The Pavakkulam South Bank - Track 07 Grama Niladhari Division has a Sinhalese majority (100.0%) . In comparison, the Vavuniya South Divisional Secretariat (which contains the Pavakkulam South Bank - Track 07 Grama Niladhari Division) has a Sinhalese majority (96.1%)

Religion 

The Pavakkulam South Bank - Track 07 Grama Niladhari Division has a Buddhist majority (99.4%) . In comparison, the Vavuniya South Divisional Secretariat (which contains the Pavakkulam South Bank - Track 07 Grama Niladhari Division) has a Buddhist majority (95.5%)

Grama Niladhari Divisions of Vavuniya South Divisional Secretariat

References